The House of Colville (Colvin) is an Anglo-Norman family in England. The family originate from Gilbert de Collevile of Colleville Sur Mer. The Domesday Book of 1086 records Gilbert's descendants as holding lands directly from the Crown in Yorkshire, specifically Arncliffe where the family would remain prominent for many centuries. Later a branch of the Colvilles also established themselves at Newton in the Isle of Ely.  

From the 17th century onwards, some members of the family switched to the use of Colvin, situated in Kent, Sussex, and later, London and the surrounding counties, notably at Monkhams Hall near Waltham Abbey, Essex.

Footnotes

Anglo-Norman families